Michael J. Barr (born October 19, 1950) is a retired American basketball player.

He played collegiately for the Duquesne Dukes. He was selected by the Chicago Bulls in the 13th round (180th pick overall) of the 1972 NBA draft, and played for the Virginia Squires (1972–74) and Spirits of St. Louis (1974–76) in the ABA and for the Kansas City Kings (1976–77) in the NBA for 307 games.

External links

1950 births
Living people
American men's basketball players
Basketball players from Canton, Ohio
Chicago Bulls draft picks
Duquesne Dukes men's basketball players
Guards (basketball)
Kansas City Kings players
Spirits of St. Louis players
Virginia Squires players